Desert Sky Mall is a regional shopping mall in west Phoenix, Arizona. It is located at 75th Avenue and Thomas Road. The mall was developed by Westcor and is managed by Macerich. The anchor stores are Curacao, Burlington, Mercado de los Cielos, and Dillard's Clearance Center. There is 1 vacant anchor store that was once Sears. Desert Sky Mall serves as a transit center for Valley Metro Bus.

History
Desert Sky Mall (originally Westridge Mall) opened in the fall of 1981. It is currently the only regional mall in the southwest valley (and as such serving major nearby suburban areas such as Avondale, Goodyear, and Tolleson).  In the years since the center's opening, the demographics of the bordering neighborhood have reflected the expansion of the Latino population in the Phoenix area.

Originally owned by Westcor, in 2002 Desert Sky Mall became part of The Macerich Company's portfolio.

In 2015, Sears Holdings spun off 235 of its properties, including the Sears at Desert Sky Mall, into Seritage Growth Properties. On October 15, 2018, it was announced that Sears would be closing as part of a plan to close 142 stores nationwide; it closed in January 2019. The former auto center is expected to become Blink Fitness.

Anchors 
 Burlington –
 Curacao –
 Dillard's Clearance Center –
 Mercado de Los Cielos –

Former Anchors 
 Diamond's – converted to Dillard's in 1984.
 JCPenney – closed 2000, replaced by Curacao in 2007.
 Mervyn's – closed 2008, replaced by Mercado de Los Cielos.
 Montgomery Ward – closed 2001, replaced by Burlington.
 Sears – closed 2018.

References

External links
 Desert Sky Mall Official website
 

Macerich
Shopping malls in Arizona
Buildings and structures in Phoenix, Arizona
Shopping malls in Maricopa County, Arizona
Tourist attractions in Phoenix, Arizona
Shopping malls established in 1981